Morehouse may refer to

Places in the United States
 Morehouse, Missouri, a city
 Morehouse, New York, a town
 Morehouse, Ohio, a ghost town
 Morehouse Parish, Louisiana
 Morehouse Lake, New York
 Morehouse Brook, New York, a creek

Other uses
 Morehouse (surname)
 Morehouse College, Atlanta, Georgia
 Morehouse School of Medicine, Atlanta, Georgia, a private medical school
 Comet Morehouse

See also
 More House, York, England
 Moorehouse (disambiguation)
 Moore House (disambiguation)